Mareks is a Latvian masculine given name and may refer to:

Mareks Ārents (born 1986), Latvian track and field athlete and Olympic competitor
Mareks Jurevičus (born 1985), Latvian professional basketball player 
Mareks Mejeris (born 1991), Latvian basketball player for Hapoel Jerusalem of the Israeli Basketball Premier League
Mareks Segliņš (born 1970), Latvian politician and lawyer

References

Latvian masculine given names